The 2009 Anchorage mayoral election was held on April 7 and May 5, 2009, to elect the mayor of Anchorage, Alaska. Since no candidate reached a 45% plurality needed to win outright, the top-two candidates advanced to a runoff. Fifteen candidates competed, with former State Rep. Eric Croft and former Anchorage Assemblyman Dan Sullivan proceeding to the runoff election, which Sullivan won with 57% of the vote.

Candidates
 Matt Claman - former Anchorage Assembly chairman, acting Mayor since January 2009
 Eric Croft - former Democratic State Representative and 2006 gubernatorial candidate
 Merica Hlatcu
 Paul Honeman
 Phil Isley
 Paul Kendall
 Jacob Seth Kern
 Dominic Lee
 Bob Lupo
 Walt Monegan - former Anchorage police chief and former Public Safety Commissioner
 Billy Ray Powers
 Sheila Selkregg - Anchorage Assemblywoman
 Larry Shooshanian
 Dan Sullivan - former Anchorage Assemblyman
 Richard Wanda

Results

First round

Runoff

References

See also

2009 United States mayoral elections
2009 Alaska elections
2009